Stenaelurillus brandbergensis, synonym Mashonarus brandbergensis, is  a species of jumping spider in the genus Stenaelurillus that lives in Namibia. It was first described in 2006 by Wanda Wesołowska and placed in the genus Mashonarus but was moved to its current genus in 2018. It is distinguished from other members of the genus by having two broad white stripes that mark both the abdomen and carapace. The epigyne in the female also has shorter insemination ducts than the otherwise similar, though larger, Stenaelurillus guttatus.

Taxonomy
Mashonarus brandbergensis was first described by Wanda Wesołowska in 2006. It is one of over 500 species  identified by the Polish arachnologist. It was initially placed in the genus Mashonarus, which had been created by Wesołowska and Meg S. Cumming in 2002. The genus name was derived from Mashonaland, the area where it was first found. At the time, the species was seen as very similar to Stenaelurillus, particularly in the structure of the epigyne and the shield-like shape of and patterns on the abdomen.

The species was moved to Stenaelurillus by Dmitri Logunov and Galina N. Azarkina in 2018. Stenaelurillus had been first raised by Eugène Simon in 1885. The genus name relates to the genus name Aelurillus, which itself derives from the Greek word for cat, with the addition of a Greek stem meaning narrow. In 2017, it was grouped with nine other genera of jumping spiders under the name Aelurillines. It has been placed in the subtribe Aelurillina in the tribe Aelurillini in the clade Saltafresia. The species name is derived from the place where it was first found, the Brandberg Mountain.

Description
The spider is medium-sized and generally similar to Stenaelurillus guttatus although smaller. The pear-shaped carapace is black with white edges. Both the abdomen and carapace have two wide stripes that go from front to back made of white hairs. Sometimes these are broken into three bands. This most distinguishes the species from Stenaelurillus guttatus  and other members of the genus in Africa. Only Stenaelurillus marusiki, found in Iran, has a similar design. The eye field is black and is surrounded by long bristles. The spinnerets are long and yellow, and the legs are light brown. The pedipalps are small, dark brown or black with some small white hairs. The palpal bulb is elongated and the embolus is thin and hidden with only the tip visible.

The female is similar to the male in shape but slightly larger. The colouring is similar. The epigyne is small with lateral copulatory openings and very short insemination ducts. Apart from the striped pattern, it is the very short insemination ducts that most distinguish the species from Stenaelurillus guttatus.

Distribution
The species was first identified in the area around the Brandberg Mountain in Namibia. It is endemic to the country.

References

Citations

Bibliography

Endemic fauna of Namibia
Fauna of Namibia
Salticidae
Spiders of Africa
Spiders described in 2006
Taxa named by Wanda Wesołowska